Kalay, also known as Kale, is a town in the Sagaing Region of Myanmar. It is located upstream from Mandalay and Monywa on the Myittha River, a tributary of the Chindwin River. The town is the district headquarters of the Kalay District. It has gained importance with trans border movement enabled between Myanmar and India following the  Tamu–Kalay section of India–Myanmar–Thailand Trilateral Highway built by the Border Roads Organization of India under the Look-East Connectivity policy. Consequently, Kalay is now one of the fastest developing towns in Myanmar.

Kalay has several notable prisons, to which people from all across the region are transported.

Etymology
The earlier name of the town ‘Karlaymyo,’ renamed now as ‘Kalaymyo,’ means “a town surrounded by four satellite towns” in the Burmese language. "Kalaymyo" means "town of children" in Burmese Language.

History
According to tradition, Kalay was established as a town on 3 February 966 (Sunday, the 5th of waning of Tabodwe 328 ME). A votive tablet unearthed in Kalay in 1983, with a Mon language inscription, refers to the "Aniruddha, the Great King".

During the Second World War, Kalay was an important regrouping point for the British during their retreat from Burma in 1942 because of the relatively easier access to India along the Manipur River (the alternative was to march through malarial forests from Kalewa to Tamu).

On September 19, 2007, 200 monks marched through the streets of Kalay as a part of the 2007 Burmese anti-government protests. Over the next few days, the monks were joined by thousands of people of the Chin ethnic group. On September 24, students marched from Kalay University with posters and protested, demanding the release of Aung San Suu Kyi and two other political prisoners.

In July 2015, a monsoon rain triggered a natural disaster, and a state of emergency was declared in four regions of the country. The disaster caused a flash flood in Kalay and surrounding areas. Kalay was devastated by the disaster.

Geography

Geographically, the distinctive feature of the town is that the Tropic of Cancer passes through it. This point has been marked by the milepost 55/56 near Kyansitgon village.

The city is drained by the Myittha River that flows in a south–north direction, the Nayyinzaya River that flows in a north–south direction, and the Manipura River (also called the Nunkathe River) from across the international border with India; the last-named river has its origin in Manipur state of the north-east India.

Climate
A tropical monsoon climate dominates the town. The average annual temperature is reported to be .

Demographics

The population of Kalay is estimated to be 400,000, comprising 35% Bamar, 55% Chin and 10% other nationalities and foreigners. The valley town, with its tranquil atmosphere, is inhabited in equal numbers by the Chin community and Bamars. The original settlers are Shans.

Economy
The economy of Kalay is dependent upon agriculture but it is also an industrial town. Cars, jeeps, trucks, fire engines, trailers, three-wheeled motorcycles are manufactured in the Kalay Industrial Estate. The town is the hub of trading activity with India across the border.

Kalay Township is unable to meet its own food requirements, although it exports food to neighbouring towns and cities. It has  under paddy,  under peas, and  under cooking oil crops. The irrigation dam in RāZāJo village will provide water to grow more crops under irrigated conditions.

Kalay Township has teak, ironwood (Pterocarpus indicus), the large timber tree Shorea obtusa, Shorea robusta and many other species of tree.

Religion
The religious composition of Kalay and the surrounding township is listed as 55 percent Buddhists (mainly Theravada Buddhists), 40 percent Christian (mainly Baptist) and the remaining 5 percent follow other religious practices. The district has 116 Buddhist monasteries, 508 churches, a mosque, two Hindu temples, two Buddhist seminaries for nuns, five Buddhist nunneries and a joss house (Chinese communal temple ).

Social infrastructure
The basic social services of education (primary to high school level, and universities within close commutable distances from the town), health services (general hospital, military hospital and traditional medicines' hospital), modern telecommunication network (telephone, Internet, telecommunication satellite network etc.), Media network of news papers (simultaneous coverage of news with Yangon), TV and radio services are well established in the town. The town's electricity needs are met from the MāNePu Hydroelectric Project, which also helps promote industries.

Transportation
The strategic road between India and Myanmar, built with assistance from the Government of India, is the  Tamu–Kalay road. The Border Roads Organization, a parastatal organization of the Government of India, started construction of this road in 1997, which was opened by the Foreign Minister of India in 2001. This road has facilitated trans-border movement between India and Myanmar. Apart from this road, the town is well connected by a network of roads with Kalay, Gangaw, Monywa, Yagyi and Mandalay. The important road route during the rainy season is the Kalay-Gangaw-Monywa-Mandalay road and during winter it is the Kalay-Myoma-Yagyi-Monywa-Mandalay Route.

Rail services also operate between Kalay and Gangaw. This line passes through the Pountaung Pounyar Tunnel.

Inland water transport is also available up to Kalaywa, which is  short of Kalay. On this route, Morlike, Homalin, Khunte, Mingin and Monywar are also accessible.

There is an airport at Kalay, an extension of a British-built Second World War airstrip that was used to ferry troops and supplies into Myanmar during the British reconquest of Myanmar in 1945. The airport is located in the middle of the town. Myanmar National Airlines, Air Bagan, Air Mandalay and Air KBZ operate regular air services to and from Yangon, Mandalay and Kalaymyo.

See also
India–Myanmar barrier
India–Myanmar relations

References

.
Populated places in Kale District
Township capitals of Myanmar